Several ships of the French Navy have borne the name Capricieuse ("Capricious"):

Ships named Capricieuse 
 (1761), a 3-gun gunboat, deleted from Navy lists in 1766.
Due to damaged sustained in the action, she was scuttled. 
 , a 32-gun . She was wrecked at the entrance of Blavet river in 1799. 
 , an aviso 
 , a 22-gun corvette.

See also

Notes, citations and references

Notes

Citations

References

French Navy ship names